Epiperipatus acacioi is a species of velvet worm in the Peripatidae family. This species is dark purple with a bilaterally symmetric pattern on its dorsal surface and ranges from 13 mm to 47 mm in length. Males of this species have 24 to 27 pairs of legs, usually 25 or 26; females have 26 to 30, usually 27 or 28. The type locality is in Minas Gerais, Brazil.

References

Further reading

Onychophorans of tropical America
Onychophoran species
Animals described in 1955